The Osteopathy Board of Australia regulates osteopathy in Australia.  The members of its inaugural board were appointed for three years by the Australian Health Workforce Ministerial Council on 31 August 2009.

Functions of the Board

The functions of the Osteopathy Board of Australia include:

registering osteopaths and students
developing standards, codes and guidelines for the osteopathy profession
handling notifications, complaints, investigations and disciplinary hearings
assessing overseas trained practitioners who wish to practise in Australia  
approving accreditation standards and accredited courses of study.

Its functions are supported by Australian Health Practitioner Regulation Agency (AHPRA).

References

Osteopathy
Medical and health organisations based in Australia